Govt. PG College Rampur Bushahr known as Govind Ballabh Pant Memorial Government PG College Rampur Bushahr is a government degree college at Part Bungalow in the town Rampur Bushahr. College is affiliated with HPU. It is established in 1959. It is situated at shore of Satluj river near NH 05 alongside of town. This college is the center for students of 4 districts.

References

Education in Himachal Pradesh
Education in Shimla district
Education in Shimla
Educational institutions established in 1959
1959 establishments in Himachal Pradesh
Universities and colleges in Himachal Pradesh